Carrollton is a village in and the county seat of Carroll County, Ohio, located  southeast of Canton. The population was 3,087 at the time of the 2020 census. It is part of the Canton–Massillon metropolitan area.

History 

The village was established as "Centreville" on October 4, 1815, at the crossroads of the Steubenville to Canton and New Lisbon to New Philadelphia roads by Peter Bohart. After the village became the county seat of newly formed Carroll County, the village name was changed on February 24, 1834. The village derives its name from Charles Carroll of Carrollton, the last surviving signer of the Declaration of Independence.

Many of the Fighting McCooks of Civil War fame lived in Carrollton. The Daniel McCook House is listed as a National Historic Place.

Geography

Carrollton is at the junction of State Routes 39 and 43. State Routes 9 and 332 also pass through the village.

A branch of the Wheeling and Lake Erie Railway passes through and ends at the Carroll County Industrial Park.

Demographics

2010 census
As of the census of 2010, there were 3,241 people, 1,347 households, and 829 families living in the village. The racial makeup of the village was 98.2% White, 0.4% African American, 0.4% Asian, 0.2% from other races, and 0.9% from two or more races. Hispanic or Latino of any race were 0.9% of the population.

There were 1,347 households, of which 29.0% had children under the age of 18 living with them, 44.5% were married couples living together, 13.0% had a female householder with no husband present, 4.0% had a male householder with no wife present, and 38.5% were non-families. 33.9% of all households were made up of individuals, and 17.6% had someone living alone who was 65 years of age or older. The average household size was 2.26 and the average family size was 2.86.

The median age in the village was 42.2 years. 22.3% of residents were under the age of 18; 8.3% were between the ages of 18 and 24; 22.2% were from 25 to 44; 24.9% were from 45 to 64; and 22.2% were 65 years of age or older. The gender makeup of the village was 44.2% male and 55.8% female.

2000 census
As of the census of 2000, there were 3,190 people, 1,428 households, and 846 families living in the village. The population density was 1,340.9 people per square mile (517.5/km). There were 1,531 housing units at an average density of 643.6 per square mile (248.4/km). The racial makeup of the village was 98.59% White, 0.25% African American, 0.19% Native American, 0.06% Asian, 0.06% from other races, and 0.85% from two or more races. Hispanic or Latino of any race were 0.47% of the population.

There were 1,428 households, out of which 25.4% had children under the age of 18 living with them, 46.0% were married couples living together, 10.7% had a female householder with no husband present, and 40.7% were non-families. 36.4% of all households were made up of individuals, and 20.6% had someone living alone who was 65 years of age or older. The average household size was 2.16 and the average family size was 2.80.

In the village, the population was spread out, with 21.4% under the age of 18, 8.1% from 18 to 24, 24.0% from 25 to 44, 23.4% from 45 to 64, and 23.0% who were 65 years of age or older. The median age was 42 years. For every 100 females there were 82.2 males. For every 100 females age 18 and over, there were 75.1 males.

The median income for a household in the village was $25,694, and the median income for a family was $38,528. Males had a median income of $31,885 versus $16,441 for females. The per capita income for the village was $14,866. About 11.3% of families and 17.0% of the population were below the poverty line, including 27.4% of those under age 18 and 21.2% of those age 65 or over.

Education
Children in Carrollton are served by the Carrollton Exempted Village School District. The current schools in the district serving the village are:
 Carrollton Elementary School – 252 Third St NE, Carrollton, OH grades K-5
 Bell-Herron Middle School – 252 Third St NE, Carrollton, OH grades 6-8
 Carrollton High School – 205 Scio Rd. SW, Carrollton, OH

Carrollton has a public library, a branch of the Carroll County District Library.

Notable people
 William Crozier, artillerist and inventor 
 Ephraim R. Eckley, U.S. Representative, Civil War Union Army brigadier general
 George Hemming, 19th century Major League Baseball player
 Kirk Lowdermilk, former American football offensive lineman for the Ohio State University and the Minnesota Vikings
 Eddie and Sam Maple, brothers who were American thoroughbred horse racing jockeys.
 Benjamin F. Potts, territorial governor of Montana

References

External links

 Village website

County seats in Ohio
Villages in Carroll County, Ohio
Villages in Ohio
Populated places established in 1815
1815 establishments in Ohio